Marshy Lake is a lake located on Vancouver Island south of western end of Horne Lake.

References

Alberni Valley
Lakes of Vancouver Island
Alberni Land District